El Carmen is a former convent converted to museum in San Ángel, a southern suburb of Mexico City.

The convent was founded on 29 June 1615 by the Discalced Carmelites in the area of the Aztec village of Tenanitla, which was later renamed San  Ángel. The founder was Father Andrés de San Miguel. This convent was built between 1615 and 1626. In the university, there was a college for theology students and a library, which contained more than 12,000 books. In 1858, the college was closed, and the complex was transferred to the local authorities. In 1929, the museum was created, and in 1939, it was transferred to the newly created Instituto Nacional de Antropología e Historia.

The museum contains a large collection of Mexical colonial religious art including paintings of Miguel Cabrera, as well as original furniture of the monastery, and a collection related to the history of the monastery and relates the life of the Carmelites.

See also
List of colonial churches in Mexico City

References

Museums in Mexico City
Roman Catholic churches in Mexico City
San Ángel, Mexico City
Baroque church buildings in Mexico
1615 establishments in New Spain
Roman Catholic churches completed in 1626
Discalced Carmelite Order
17th-century Roman Catholic church buildings in Mexico